Janet Awuor Owino (also spelled Owino; born August 8, 1985) is a Kenyan rugby sevens player. She has been selected as a member of the Kenya women's national rugby sevens team to the 2016 Summer Olympics. She was in Kenya's sevens team for the 2016 France Women's Sevens.

References

External links 
 
 

1985 births
Living people
Female rugby sevens players
Rugby sevens players at the 2016 Summer Olympics
Olympic rugby sevens players of Kenya
Kenya international rugby sevens players
Kenya international women's rugby sevens players